Throdkin is a traditional breakfast food of the Fylde, Lancashire, England. There are different preparations but all are made from oatmeal and bacon fat.

Description

One recipe calls for a pound of oatmeal mixed with some bacon fat to create a dough the consistency of pastry. The dough is then shaped into a brick shape and baked, often with a strip of bacon on top.
Another version consists of a dough of oatmeal and water pressed into a pie plate, topped with pieces of fat bacon, and baked. It was cut into wedges tart-style for serving

The throdkin could also be baked and then fried in bacon fat.

There is a sweet variety from Blackpool which incorporates currants.

History

It is listed, with an earliest instance in 1837, by Joseph Wright in his 1905 The English Dialect Dictionary.

See also
 British cuisine

References

Other sources
 Kirk, Edward (3 January 1876), Manchester Guardian, quoted in Nodal, John Howard & Milner, George (1875) "A Glossary of the Lancashire Dialect", p.262, Manchester: Alexander Ireland & Co.

English cuisine
Bacon dishes
Lancashire cuisine